Wilsum is a community in the district of Grafschaft Bentheim in Lower Saxony, Germany near the Dutch border, and it belongs to the Joint Community (Samtgemeinde) of Uelsen.

History
Wilsum had its first documentary mention in 851. Since the Middle Ages it has belonged to the County (now district) of Bentheim (Grafschaft Bentheim). In the Dutch Revolt, the community was very adversely affected in the years from 1580 to 1605; many inhabitants fled to the Netherlands. In 1725 a church was built.

Religion
 Evangelical Reformed parish
 Evangelical Old Reformed parish (regionally also known as Koksch)

Sightseeing
 Schoneveld's Mill, a watermill believed to have been built in the 13th century

References

County of Bentheim (district)